At  the Kreuzjoch is the highest peak in the Kitzbühel Alps in the Austrian state of Tyrol.

The Kreuzjoch also forms the southwestern end of the Kitzbühel Alps. To the west it is bounded by the Ziller valley, to the southeast by the Gerlos valley. The Kreuzjoch's neighbouring peak is the Torhelm (2,494 m).

Mountains of the Alps
Mountains of Tyrol (state)
Two-thousanders of Austria
Kitzbühel Alps